Arabidopsis arenicola, the Arctic rock-cress, is a plant species native to the northeastern part of North America. It has been reported from Greenland, Labrador, Nunavut, Northwest Territories, Québec, Ontario, Manitoba, and Saskatchewan. It grows on sandy or gravely beaches or stream banks at elevations below .

References

arenicola
Flora of British Columbia
Flora of Greenland
Flora of Labrador
Flora of Manitoba
Flora of Newfoundland
Flora of the Northwest Territories
Flora of Nunavut
Flora of Ontario
Flora of Quebec
Flora of Saskatchewan
Flora without expected TNC conservation status